RFA Maine was a hospital ship of the British Royal Fleet Auxiliary, which served during the Second Boer War, up until the eve of World War I.

The first ship to bear the name was the former cattle/passenger ship Swansea, built by William Gray & Company of Hartlepool, and launched on 8 June 1887. Owned and operated by Bernard N. Baker's Atlantic Transport Line, Swansea was renamed Maine in 1888.

Conversion to hospital ship
In October 1899 the Boer War broke out in South Africa and Baker immediately offered the British Admiralty the use of a vessel as a hospital ship. Funding for the conversion was raised by the "American Ladies Hospital Ship Society" based in London and headed by Jennie Churchill. The Maine sailed for South Africa on 23 December 1899, with Jennie Churchill aboard, and arrived at Durban on 23 January 1900. One of the earliest beneficiaries was Jennie's younger son Jack, wounded during the Relief of Ladysmith. After only four months, she returned to UK and then went to China for the Boxer Rebellion.
The following year she was again back in the UK, and in March 1901 she served in the Mediterranean as hospital ship to the Mediterranean Squadron.

In RFA service
At the end of war the ship was donated to the British Government and entered Navy service on 29 June 1901, and became a Royal Fleet Auxiliary ship in 1905 on the formation of the service. In June 1911 she took part in the Coronation Fleet Review for King George V at Torbay. She was lost on 17 June 1914 when she ran aground in fog on the Isle of Mull, Scotland and was wrecked. On 6 July 1914 the wreck was sold for scrap.

References

External links
 The Atlantic Transport Line, 1881-1936
RFA Maine
Photos of Maine

Ships built on the River Tees
Hospital ships of the United Kingdom
Ships of the Royal Fleet Auxiliary
Shipwrecks of Scotland
1887 ships
Maritime incidents in June 1914